LeRoy Irvin (born September 15, 1957) is a former American football player. He was a member of the Los Angeles Rams from 1980 to 1989.   He played cornerback.  He played in the Pro Bowl in 1986 and 1987. He  holds the record for most punt return yards in a single game (207), set against the Atlanta Falcons in 1981. Irvin is one of only a few players in NFL history to be named All-Pro at two positions.  Irvin was born at Fort Dix in New Jersey and attended high school at Glenn Hills High School in Augusta, Georgia. He began his college career in 1976 at the University of Kansas.

Irvin made two pro bowl appearances (1985, 1986) and was named All-Pro four times (1981, 1982, 1985 and 1986).  He was an assistant football coach at California State University, Northridge in 1992.

Irvin currently works with former Los Angeles Rams teammate Vince Ferragamo at End Zone Mortgage in Anaheim Hills, California. He started a company with former Rams teammate Eric Dickerson, Larry Westbrook and Mike Hope called Original Mini's, Inc. The company holds an NFL license and offers a line of NFL Licensed products.  He appeared in the 1986 Rams promotional video, Let's Ram It, where he called himself the "Iceman" and stated that interceptions were his game.

Irvin is the father of four children (Leroy III, Charles, Sarah, and Julius) and currently resides in Anaheim Hills.

References

1957 births
Living people
American football cornerbacks
American football return specialists
Cal State Northridge Matadors football coaches
Detroit Lions players
Kansas Jayhawks football players
Los Angeles Rams players
National Conference Pro Bowl players
People from Fort Dix
Sportspeople from Burlington County, New Jersey
African-American coaches of American football
African-American players of American football
People from Anaheim Hills, California
21st-century African-American people
20th-century African-American sportspeople